Zardón is one of eleven parishes (administrative divisions) in Cangas de Onís, a municipality within the province and autonomous community of Asturias, by northern Spain's Picos de Europa mountains.

Villages
 Bustuvela
 Ixena
 Santianes d'Ola
 Zardón

References

Parishes in Cangas de Onis